The Island of Forbidden Kisses (German: Die Insel der verbotenen Küsse) is a 1927 German silent adventure film directed by Georg Jacoby and starring Stewart Rome, Marietta Millner and Elga Brink. The interiors were shot at the EFA Studios in Berlin. The film's art direction was by Franz Schroedter and Hermann Warm.

Cast
In alphabetical order
Georg Alexander 
Georg Baselt 
Henry Bender 
Elga Brink 
Georg Jacoby 
Margarete Kupfer 
Marietta Millner 
Stewart Rome 
Jack Trevor

References

External links

Films of the Weimar Republic
German silent feature films
Films directed by Georg Jacoby
1927 adventure films
German adventure films
German black-and-white films
Silent adventure films
Films shot at Halensee Studios
1920s German films